Umuahia South is a Local Government Area of Abia State, Nigeria. Its headquarters is at Apumiri in Ubakala.
 
It has an area of 140 km and a population of 138,570 at the 2006 census.

The postal code of the area is 440.

See also 
List of villages in Abia State

References

Local Government Areas in Abia State